Meine Ehre heißt Treue ("My honor means loyalty") was the motto of the Schutzstaffel (SS) under Adolf Hitler and the Nazi Party in Nazi Germany.

Origin 
In a National Socialist context, the phrase Meine Ehre heißt Treue refers to a declaration by Adolf Hitler following the Stennes Revolt, an incident between the Berlin Sturmabteilung (SA) and the Schutzstaffel (SS). In early April 1931, elements of the SA under Walter Stennes attempted to overthrow the head of the Berlin section of the National Socialist German Workers' Party. As the section chief Joseph Goebbels fled with his staff, a handful of SS men led by Kurt Daluege were beaten trying to repel the SA. After the incident, Hitler wrote a letter of congratulations to Daluege, stating ... SS-Mann, deine Ehre heißt Treue! ("Man of the SS, your honor is loyalty"). Soon afterward, Reichsführer-SS Heinrich Himmler, adopted the modified version of this phrase as the official motto of the organisation.

Laws

Since 1947, the use of this motto or variations of it are prohibited in Austria and Germany in their laws pertaining to the use of symbols of anti-constitutional organizations, e.g. in Germany, Strafgesetzbuch 86a. The sentence is used by some extreme-right organisations.

Recently 
Jurica Živoder (29), a contestant on the Croatian RTL television show "Love is in the countryside", was removed from the show in April 2021 after viewers complained about his "Meine Ehre heißt Treue" tattoo. The producers in response gave a statement: "all his scenes will be cut before airing after discovering he also liked a Facebook page titled 'Adolf Hitler's political beliefs.

See also
 Honneur et Fidélité
 Semper fidelis

Notes and references 

Mottos
Nazi SS
German words and phrases
German political catchphrases
1930s neologisms
Political terminology in Germany